The Blue–Green Rivalry is the name of the rivalry between athletic teams from the University of California, Santa Barbara and California Polytechnic State University, the UC Santa Barbara Gauchos and the Cal Poly Mustangs.  Athletic competition between the two schools began in the 1921 on the football field.

The rivalry is best known recently for its games between the UC Santa Barbara Gauchos men's soccer and Cal Poly Mustangs men's soccer teams and is called the "Greatest Rivalry In College Soccer".

History

First meeting 
The UCSB Gauchos and Cal Poly Mustangs met in their first collegiate athletic event on November 5, 1921.  Santa Barbara State Teachers College, as UC Santa Barbara was known then, started a football team and played Cal Poly, with Poly coming out as 42–0 winners.

California Collegiate Athletic Association 
The rivalry heated up when both schools were members of the California Collegiate Athletic Association.  The Gauchos joined the CCAA in 1939 and the Mustangs joined in 1945.  The two would remain in-conference rival until the Gauchos departed in 1969 for the newly formed Pacific Coast Athletic Association.

Big West Conference 
The Pacific Coast Athletic Association would later become known as the Big West Conference.  Cal Poly joined in 1996 and the two have been competing in-conference match ups since.

Formalization of the Blue–Green Rivalry 
The two schools announced the formalization of the Blue–Green Rivalry in 2009 to highlight the athletic accomplishments, but also to promote environmental sustainability.  October 2012 saw the schools increase promotions of the rivalry, including the addition of a new website.  However, this website has since been discontinued.

Results (Formalized rivalry era)

Men's soccer 
The best known of the Blue–Green Rivalry games, Cal Poly and UCSB play each other twice a year in Big West Conference play.  With both schools located on the Central Coast of California less than 100 miles apart, attendance has risen dramatically following the Gauchos' 2006 NCAA Division I Men's Soccer Championship.  The crowds of these games are record-setting and are among the highest regular season games in NCAA college soccer history.

Source:

Men's basketball

 Note: NCAA Division I play only
 Series table does not include results prior to the 1949–50 NCAA men's basketball season

Source:

References

External links 
 
 Blue-Green Rivalry on http://www.gopoly.com/

College basketball rivalries in the United States
College soccer rivalries in the United States
College sports rivalries in the United States
Soccer rivalries in the United States
UC Santa Barbara Gauchos
Cal Poly Mustangs
1937 establishments in California